Sergio Santos Fernández (born 3 January 2001) is a Spanish professional footballer who mainly plays as a right-back for CD Mirandés, on loan from Real Madrid.

Career
A youth product of Pérez Galdós and Leganés, Santos joined the youth academy of Real Madrid in 2012. He worked his way up their youth categories, and was promoted to their reserves in 2020. He made his professional debut with Real Madrid in a 6–1 La Liga win over Mallorca on 22 September 2021.

On 21 July 2022, Santos was loaned to Segunda División side CD Mirandés for the season.

Career statistics

Club

Honours
Real Madrid Juvenil A
UEFA Youth League: 2019–20

References

External links
Real Madrid profile

2001 births
Living people
People from Leganés
Spanish footballers
Spain youth international footballers
Association football fullbacks
Real Madrid Castilla footballers
Real Madrid CF players
CD Mirandés footballers
La Liga players
Segunda División players
Primera Federación players
Segunda División B players